The 2022 Windsor municipal election was held on October 24, 2022, to elect the Mayor of Windsor, Windsor City Council and the Greater Essex County District School Board, Windsor Essex Catholic District School Board, Conseil scolaire catholique Providence and Conseil scolaire Viamonde. The election will be held on the same day as elections in every other municipality in Ontario.

The candidates registered to run for Windsor City Council are as follows:

Mayor
Mayor Drew Dilkens is being challenged by city councillor Chris Holt.

Mayoral Election Map Gallery

City Council

Ward 1

Ward 2

Ward 3

Ward 4

Ward 5

Ward 6

Ward 7

Ward 8

Ward 9

Ward 10

References

Windsor
Municipal elections in Windsor, Ontario